Langeveldt is a surname. Notable people with the surname include:
Timmins Langeveldt (born 1993), Zimbabwean Software Developer
Ryan Langeveldt (born 1999), Zimbabwean Drone Engineer
Charl Langeveldt (born 1974), South African cricketer
Edgar Langeveldt, Zimbabwean stand-up comedian, singer-songwriter and actor
Lee Langeveldt (born 1986), South African association footballer 
Stuart Langeveldt (born 1971), South African born, Australian brand, marketing and communications expert